Rusticucci is a surname. Notable people with the surname include:

Girolamo Rusticucci (1537–1603), Italian cardinal
Iacopo Rusticucci ( 1200 – after 1266), Florentine politician
Ricardo Rusticucci (1946–2014), Argentine sport shooter

Italian-language surnames